Christine Isobel Correa (born July 8, 1955) is an American jazz singer of Indian origin.

Life and work
Correa is from a musical family; her father Micky Correa led big bands in India. As a child she sang and played piano. In 1979, she moved to the U.S. and attended the New England Conservatory of Music, where her teachers included Jaki Byard, Ran Blake, and Joe Maneri.  She worked with the quintet of Frank Carlberg, in ballet music for the Battery Dance Company. She teaches at Columbia University and is the  director the Maine Jazz Camp.

Discography
With Ran Blake
 Round About (Music & Arts, 1994)
 Out of the Shadows (Red Piano, 2010)
 Down Here Below: Tribute to Abbey Lincoln Volume One (Red Piano, 2012)
 The Road Keeps Winding: Tribute to Abbey Lincoln Volume Two (Red Piano, 2015)
 Streaming (Red Piano, 2018)
 When Soft Rains Fall (Red Piano, 2021)

With Frank Carlberg
 Ugly Beauty (Northeastern, 1993)
 The Crazy Woman (Accurate, 1995)
 Variations On A Summer Day (Fresh Sound New Talent, 1999)
 In The Land Of Art (Fresh Sound New Talent, 2002)
 State of The Union (Fresh Sound New Talent, 2005)
 The American Dream (Red Piano, 2007)
 Uncivilized Ruminations (Red Piano, 2009)
 Big Enigmas (Red Piano, 2012)
 Word Circus (Red Piano, 2014)
 No Money In Art (Red Piano, 2016)

References

1955 births
Living people
American women jazz singers
American jazz singers
Columbia University faculty
Indian emigrants to the United States
Singers from Mumbai
Music & Arts artists
American women academics
21st-century American women